Myrcia wilsonii is a species of plant in the family Myrtaceae. It is endemic to eastern Jamaica.  It is threatened by habitat loss.

References

wilsonii
Vulnerable plants
Endemic flora of Jamaica
Taxonomy articles created by Polbot